"Jacky" (La chanson de Jacky) is a song written by the Belgian singer-songwriter Jacques Brel and Gérard Jouannest. Brel recorded the song on 2 November 1965, and it was released on his 1966 album Ces Gens-Là. The song was translated from French into English and retitled "Jackie".

The song has been covered a number of times, particularly in Europe. In the United States, the song's popularity grew through its appearance (as "Jackie") in the score of the off-Broadway revue Jacques Brel is Alive and Well and Living in Paris, which opened on 22 January 1968.

Scott Walker version

"Jackie" was later recorded and released by the American singer-songwriter Scott Walker as his first solo single in 1967. Walker recorded the Mort Shuman translation. The accompaniment was directed by Wally Stott.

The single met with controversy in the UK likely because of lyrics like "authentic queers and phony virgins" and drug references. The song was banned by the BBC and was not performed on the corporation's TV or played on the mainstream radio channels. The song was performed on non-BBC channels, most notably on Frankie Howerd's show Howerd's Hour where Walker danced comically during the performance.

"Jackie" was a moderate hit spending nine weeks on the UK Singles Chart and peaking at No. 22 in January 1968. The following year it was included as the opening track on Walker's most popular album Scott 2.

The single is notable for including one of Walker's few non-album b-sides. The accompaniment for "The Plague" was directed by Peter Knight in an atypical arrangement that featured guitar and female backing singers. English singer Marc Almond covered "The Plague" in 1986 for his covers EP A Woman's Story.

Track listing

Chart positions

Other recordings
In 1977, Jacky (entitled as "Jackie") was recorded by Peter Straker on his album This One's On Me, which was co-produced by his close friend Freddie Mercury.  He has since recorded the song a second time for his 2012 album and associated stage show Brel.

In May 1986, Momus released his version of the song, retitled as "Nicky" after the singer's first name, as the title track of a three-song EP of Brel covers.

In 1991, Marc Almond recorded a cover version of Brel's song for his album Tenement Symphony, and released it as a single. It reached No. 17 in the UK and No. 14 in Ireland, as well as number six on Finland's sales-only chart.

In 2012, Secret Chiefs 3 and Mike Patton collaborated under the moniker Traditionalists to release a cover of this on the Mimicry record label. It also marks the first recorded collaboration of original Mr. Bungle founders Mike Patton and Trey Spruance since the band dissolved in 2004.

References

Jacques Brel songs
Songs written by Jacques Brel
French-language songs
1965 songs
1967 debut singles
1991 singles
Scott Walker (singer) songs
Marc Almond songs
Philips Records singles
Songs banned by the BBC